Magma (Amara Juliana Olivians Aquilla, also known as Alison Crestmere) is a fictional character appearing in American comic books published by Marvel Comics. The character was co-created by Chris Claremont, John Buscema, Glynis Wein and Bob McLeod, and first appears in the series New Mutants and is also associated with various X-Men-related comics.

Like other New Mutants characters, Amara was originally depicted as a young mutant aspiring to become a hero. She is a mutant with the ability to generate lava and uses the codename Magma.

Publication history
Magma debuted in The New Mutants #8 (Oct. 1983), appearing in that title regularly through The New Mutants #57 (Nov. 1987), in which she departs the titular supergroup to join their rivals, the Hellions. Along with the other New Mutants, she appeared as an occasional supporting character in The Uncanny X-Men, with issue #189 (1985) as a salient issue featuring her conflict with Selene at the Hellfire Club. After her being dropped from the regular cast, The New Mutants featured two Magma solo stories, occupying the entirety of The New Mutants #62 (April 1988) and The New Mutants #81 (Nov. 1989). The latter was a fill-in issue written while she was still a regular cast member.

Magma appeared infrequently during the 1990s, but did take part in the "Child's Play" crossover through X-Force #32-33 and The New Warriors #45-46 (1994). In X-Force #87-90 (1997), Magma appeared as an antagonist to her former teammates, but her villainous personality was short-lived as she returned to her affiliation with the X-Men in semi-regular publication in New Mutants vol. 2 #3-4, #7-8, #11 and #13 (2003-2004) and as a team member in X-Treme X-Men #34-46 (2004). Magma then featured prominently as a member of the 198 remaining mutants on earth in the limited series X-Men: The 198 #1-5 (2006) and then in Young X-Men #1-6 (2008) until returning to regular monthly publication in New Mutants vol. 3 #1 (2009) wherein she remained as a regular character through issue #50 (2012).

Fictional character biography

Early life
Magma (Amara Juliana Olivians Aquilla) hails from the fictional country of Nova Roma ("New Rome"), a colony of the Roman Republic reportedly founded shortly after the death of Julius Caesar in 44 BC. The colony is hidden in the Amazon Rainforests of modern Brazil and was ruled until recently by the immortal witch Selene. Amara is the daughter of Lucius Antonius Aquilla. He was presumably a member of the historical gens Antonia which claimed descent from Anton, son of Hercules. Growing up in Nova Roma, she had curly blonde hair, and wore a traditional white Roman toga.

Caught up in a deadly power struggle between Selene and her father, she disguises herself as an indigenous Brazilian and is captured by the New Mutants, who soon discovers her true ethnicity. Her powers manifest after she is abducted by Selene, who throws her into a lava pool. Amara is defeated by Selene, but later rescued by the New Mutants and adopts the name 'Magma' as her heroic identity. At her father's urging, she leaves Nova Roma, in the company of the New Mutants, to be taught by Charles Xavier.

New Mutants
After the New Mutants visit Nova Roma, Magma officially enters Xavier's school and joins the New Mutants. She invades the Hellfire Club's New York headquarters to battle Selene. She is fooled into joining a gladiatorial competition run by the insane Shadow King. She partners with Sunspot. Eventually, the efforts of her other friends free her and Sunspot from the cult-like control of the games.

Mistaking the New Mutants for the X-Men, the Enchantress kidnaps them during their Greek vacation and takes them to Asgard. The teleportation spell created by her teammate Magik goes awry when blocked by the Enchantress' own power. Thrown through time and space, Magma ends up in the elven realm. They trick her into eating and drinking, thus making her one of their own, body and mind. She participates in a raid on the Asgardian dwarves, where she is defeated by Cannonball. The dwarves, grateful to Cannonball, restore Magma's mind, but they cannot restore her body. This becomes moot when the team is sent back home, with all magical alterations reversed. Some time later, she encounters Hercules, discovering he is one of the gods she worshiped.

After a time, Magma recognizes her grandmother, "many times removed" in a statue depicting the ancient lunar deity Selene. The witch Selene approaches her to claim having been both the model for the statue and the ancestor in question. Magma and the New Mutants clash with Emma Frost and her super-powered teens, the Hellions on multiple occasions. Despite the cruelties displayed by the Hellion Empath, Magma develops an attraction towards him. She recognizes this and is distressed by her feelings. Soon after, Magma leaves the New Mutants and joins the Hellions.

Hellions
She trains with the Hellions, and returns to South America with Empath. She later reveals to the New Mutants that her father arranged her engagement to a South American prince. She is captured by the High Evolutionary's agents Dr. Stack and Purge, but is rescued by the New Mutants.

It is later revealed that Nova Roma is not Roman, but was created by Selene using mind control on British citizens to recreate Rome, and that Magma's real name is Allison Crestmere. While still under the influence of the "Allison" persona, she briefly resurfaces as a member of the New Hellions.

Return and going
Later, she is one of the mutants who appears crucified on the X-Men's lawn. While she is saved by a transfusion of Archangel's blood, when she goes to sleep, she lapses into a deep coma. She is forcibly revived by Elixir, a traumatic event which prompts her to destroy the infirmary and flee in a rage. Further telepathic contact with Magma is rebuffed.

Rejoining the X-Men
When she eventually arrives in Los Angeles, as Amara once more, she meets up with Cannonball, who had joined a splinter team of X-Men. She aids this team for a time, and when the "Allison Crestmere" identity is brought up by Cannonball, Magma reveals that Elixir's healing had removed the "Allison" personality, she now realizes that it was, in fact, a deception.

Amara returns to the school for a while. When her friend Wolfsbane had to leave, Magma takes over her advisory role, becoming the leader of the Paragons.

Magma is part of the X-Treme Sanctions Executive, although she is never seen as taking part of any missions on-panel.

Post M-Day
Due to the events of House of M and the Decimation of mutants, Magma loses her boyfriend while the two are exploring the inside of a volcano at the exact moment that the depowering wave of the Scarlet Witch runs across Earth. His death temporarily drives her insane causing her to make the volcano erupt and attack a nearby town. She is later apprehended by Empath and brought to the Xavier Institute where she shares a tent with Skids and Outlaw. She then falls victim to being manipulated by the mutant Johnny Dee who is infatuated with her. Because of previous experience with being emotionally controlled, she incorrectly blames Empath who denies her accusations.

Young X-Men
Along with former New Mutants, Danielle Moonstar, Cannonball, and Sunspot, Magma appeared to be a member of the newest incarnation of the Brotherhood of Mutants, as claimed by Cyclops. She is one of the first members targeted by the new team of X-Men, composed primarily of former Xavier Institute students. During the battle, Amara turns Dust into glass by superheating her sand form, shatters Rockslide (who later reforms), and is eventually taken out by Wolf Cub. She is held in a holding cell in the custody of Cyclops. It is eventually revealed that "Cyclops" is in reality Donald Pierce, the former White King of the Hellfire Club, who is posing as the X-Men leader using an image inducer. Pierce's reasons for recruiting these "X-Men" is currently unknown, but it was revealed that Pierce utilized the ruse that Magma and her allies formed a new Brotherhood in order to convince the former students to attack their former teachers and allies. She later helps to capture him and then relocates to San Francisco.

Reforming the New Mutants
After receiving an anonymous tip in Colorado about a young mutant endangering a small town, Dani and Shan are sent to investigate and calm the locals. During their mission, Magik reappears back at the X-Men's base in San Francisco after teleporting off into the future after the events of "X-Infernus". Upon her return, Magik informs Sam and Roberto that Shan and Dani are in trouble, a situation that will result in their deaths. Amara is visiting with Empath in his cell when she is called away by Sam. Amara questions as to whether Illyana is the real Illyana. Sam assembles a team of X-Men consisting of himself, Sunspot, Magma, and Magik to go find Dani and Shan. While en route, Illyana asks Magma why she visits Empath in his cell since he tried to kill her friends and asks if she still loves him. Magma stumbles to answer and Magik accuses her of still having feelings for Empath. Magik then tells Magma that she will help cure Empath if Magma wishes and will keep the whole thing a secret from the others.

While searching for Shan and Dani in Colorado, the girls split up and Sam and Roberto come across a tied up and unconscious Shan in the back of a bar, while Magik and Magma are tricked into freeing Legion from a box. The personalities in Legion's mind want to kill Dani because she can help Legion get them under control. Legion locates Dani in a jail cell and is about to kill her when Sam stops him. Legion is forced outside where he distracts Sam and Sunspot while again trying to kill Dani, only to be stopped by Magma and Magik. After Legion takes out Sunspot, Magma attacks Legion, who manages to counter her attacks by making her feel extremely cold, taking her out of the fight.

Utopia
Magma is mentioned by Pixie as one of the first mutants being teleported to Utopia, the X-Men's new island home. She is later seen alongside Match during the final fight against Norman Osborn's forces, throwing fire at Venom, as well as lighting a small area on fire around Colossus during his fight with Venom.

Necrosha
Magma is targeted by Selene, who wants her dead. Selene sends Magma's former teammate Cypher to kill her. After breaking into her room, he surprises Amara, viciously beating her unconscious and dragging her body to the kitchen for Amara's teammates to see before he engages them in battle. During the fight, the deceased Hellions show up to reclaim Doug while the New Mutants teleport away. The New Mutants split up, with Dani and Sunspot taking Amara to Utopia's medical lab. On the way they are attacked by Feral, who is quickly taken out by Sunspot and Dani. Upon arriving at the lab, Doctor Nemesis injects Amara with a serum which activates her powers and heals most of her wounds.

While she is still recovering from her wounds, Doug arrives to apologize. At first Amara tells him to leave, but he convinces Amara to hear him out by communicating with her in a special language he designed for her. She then thanks him and welcomes him back.

Second Coming
When Cable and Hope Summers arrive back from the future, Bastion and his Purifiers attempt to kill them. The New Mutants are sent to gather intel on weapons being produced by Cameron Hodge in St. Louis. After arriving back on Utopia, Amara hears a series of explosions, and she, Namor, and X-23 find that Donald Pierce has destroyed the X-Men's hangar. Amara then goes with a team of X-Men to help out in San Francisco when the city is surrounded by a giant, impenetrable dome. Upon discovering a giant sphere on the Golden Gate Bridge, the X-Men investigate, and several Nimrod Sentinels emerge. After defeating the first fleet of Nimrods, Amara stands guard with several other X-Men, awaiting more.

Fall of the New Mutants
After the events of the "Second Coming" storyline, the New Mutants take a vacation, which is interrupted when Magik discovers that Pixie has been kidnapped by a mysterious military faction known as Project Purgatory. After traveling Limbo for days searching for her, the New Mutants are attacked by the mutant babies gathered during "Inferno", now adults working with Project Purgatory. During the fight, Amara is the last to be captured after Trista used Face to knock her out. Amara is then held captive along with Sunspot. Eventually Illyana is placed in their cell and after being asked by Roberto how Amara dies, Illyana tells him she does not love him like he loves her and to listen carefully.

Rise of the New Mutants
After Magik, Pixie and Karma escape back to Utopia, Amara remains a captive of Project Purgatory along with the remaining New Mutants in Limbo. She is eventually freed by Dani and upon exiting the compound, sees that Project Purgatory have summoned the Elder Gods and torn a hole right through to Earth. Amara sees the past version of Magik who helped reform the New Mutants and tries to warn her about what's to come but is stopped by Roberto. He reveals that if she goes by herself to warn Illyana, she will die. Working together, Sunspot holds off a horde while Amara goes to Illyana. Three days later, Amara is seen tending to Roberto in the infirmary.

Unfinished Business
After Dani Moonstar learns Cyclops is still keeping the New Mutants together to settle some of the X-Men's unfinished business; several members leave due to injury or personal issues. Magma remains on the team alongside Dani Moonstar, Cypher, Warlock and Sunspot. Their first mission is to track down X-Man, who had been kidnapped by Sugar Man.

Fear Itself
After Dani is summoned to Hel by Hela during an attack by the Draumar, Amara and the rest of the New Mutants go looking for her. They seek help from Magik, who points them to a spell that can get the team to Hel. Cypher performs the spell but accidentally transports the team to Mephisto's hell. While there, Mephisto takes a special interest in Amara. Sunspot attempts to attack him when he won't leave the team alone, but Amara intervenes. Impressed by Amara's display of power, Mephisto apologies and offers to help the team in exchange for a single date with her. The other members of the team advise against the deal, but Amara accepts. With a flick of his wrist, the team are teleported to Hel.

Arriving in Hel, Sunspot is upset Amara made a deal with the devil when they come across a battle outside Hela's palace between the undead and the Draumar. After finding Dani and Hela, the New Mutants drive back the Draumar and Hela transports the team back to Utopia.

Regenesis and dating Mephisto
Following the events of X-Men: Schism, Amara is seen discussing the idea of going to Westchester with Sunspot. Bobby brings up the idea of getting a place together in San Francisco, but she turns him down. Later she moves in with the rest of the New Mutants when they decide to get a place together in the city. Amara later takes part in a mission to locate Blink and uses her abilities to stop an earthquake. During the mission, she makes it clear to Bobby that she is not interested in him anymore.

Around this time, Mephisto comes to collect on his debt and escorts Magma on their date. Taking Amara to the third circle of hell, he goes overboard trying to impress her, but Amara becomes overwhelmed; revealing she is too fearful to enjoy the date in case he tries to trick her into another deal. Mephisto shocks Amara by revealing that despite being the personification of evil, he feels human emotions and just wants to have a normal date. Returning to San Francisco to continue their date, they end up having a good time with Mephisto asking if he can call her again.

Sometime later, Cypher experiences a nightmare regarding the Ani-Mator; the team head back to Paradise Island to find it has changed dramatically. They locate Bird-Brain who attacks and infects the squad with a virus. During the mission, Bobby makes several passive-aggressive remarks about Amara's relationship with Mephisto. Bobby eventually collapses from exhaustion and Amara cares for him. The pair are partially assimilated into the Ani-Mator's new body but are freed thanks to Cypher and Warlock.

Blink eventually returns to visit the team and whisks them to Madripoor for a vacation. During the trip, Amara reveals to Clarice she has still been seeing Mephisto and asks her not to tell anyone. Eventually Mephisto's relationship with Magma collapses after she uncovered his dealings with the Disir, which caused her to call off any chance of furthering their relationship, much to his displeasure.

Fearless Defenders
After the New Mutants disband, Dani joins a new female incarnation of the Defenders. During a moment of downtime, Dani invites Amara to New Amazonia where she comments it reminds her of Nova Roma. During her stay, Hippolyta explains that she has been charged by the Death-Lords to rebuild the ranks of the Amazons in exchange for her resurrection. The following morning, New Amazonia is attacked by Aradnea, Echidna, and Echidna's sea-monsters on-orders from Caroline Le Fey. Amara powers up and goes straight for the "big one". After the monsters are defeated, Caroline reveals that the attack was a test and offers to become the Amazons' queen.

X-Men: Gold
In the wake of the conflict between mutants and Inhumans, anti-mutant activist Lydia Nance hired Mesmero to assemble a new Brotherhood of Evil Mutants, whose acts of terrorism she used to propel her platform. Magma is revealed to be one of the members when they attack the United Nations and are confronted by Kitty Pryde's squad of X-Men. Magma and the Brotherhood eventually escape and kidnap the mayor of New York City, Bill de Blasio. It was also discovered by the X-Men that Mesmero had used his powers to brainwash the members of his Brotherhood to join the team and force them to carry out those attacks. Once his control was broken, Mesmero's Brotherhood was dissolved, and except for Amara, the rest of the team were handed over to S.H.I.E.L.D., ultimately leading to its disbandment. Following the ordeal, Amara decides to stay with the X-Men to recuperate.

Later when Rachel Summers is injured on a mission, Amara is seen watching over her in the medical bay with Cecilia Reyes, showing great concern over her condition. She is later called back into the medical bay when Rachel's hound marks reappear on her face.

Mesmero eventually escapes from the Box, a prison designed to hold mutants and persuades the new Pyro and Avalanche to help him get revenge on Lydia Nance by attacking her at a fundraiser. Magma demands to join the mission, but Kitty expresses concern about having her along, fearing she might be emotionally compromised. Kitty orders Nightcrawler to keep an eye on her and they teleport to the yacht; Amara ignores orders and goes straight for Mesmero who knocks her out. Kurt teleports her unconscious body back to the mansion and she is not present when the rest of the X-Men are arrested and imprisoned.

After she recovers, Amara joins Iceman's squad of interim X-Men consisting of Rogue, Ink, Armor, Magik and the new Pyro, Simon Lasker. Their first mission as a team is to stop the Shredded Man. Once the mission is over, they head to Paris, France to stop Scythian. They team up with Captain Britain and Meggan while Magik goes to fetch the imprisoned X-Men. Working together, they manage to send him to Limbo.

X-Men Disassembled 
Magma was one of the many mutants that opposed the crazed X-Man from remaking the world in his image. When X-Man realized that his vision of the world would never come about with the X-Men around, X-Man made his enemies vanish in an instant, including Magma.

House of X 
Magma later became a resident of the mutant nation of Krakoa. While there she joined the New Mutants on a mission to bring some mutants from her home town of Nova Roma to Krakoa and to save a young mutant from Carnelia who could not control her powers. She also attempted to cause a volcanic eruption to help free the mutants who were wrongfully imprisoned in the Pit of Exile.

Powers and abilities

Magma is a mutant with geothermal powers. These grant her control over tectonic plates, even to the extent of causing seismic upheaval. Amara's powers allow her to be so in-tune with the Earth, she is able to sense seismic activity and prevent earthquakes before they happen. She can also call forth molten rock from the Earth's core, producing projectiles composed of lava, or miniature volcanoes.

When using her powers, Magma typically assumes an energized form that emits intense light and heat. While in this form, Amara can increase the temperature around her to the point where anything around her will melt like metal weapons will melt before inflicting her with any damage. On another occasion, she has  demonstrated this ability without assuming her energized form by heating up the room at a Hellfire Club party causing everyone in the room to sweat to the point of dehydration and blacking out. She can also create orbs of a fire-like substance and use them as projectiles or a source of light. Although Magma has triggered small earth tremors without taking on her energized form, she has never been seen to use her power to control lava while in her ordinary human appearance. On M-Day, she traveled within the heated gases of an active volcano, and demonstrates an immunity to volcanic gases, heat, and flame.

In addition, Amara possesses certain regenerative powers when in contact with the ground. Even when she was once affected by Selene's life-draining touch, she recovered quickly enough to aid the New Mutants in battle. If she is not in contact with the ground or the physical shock to her system from a single injury is too great, the regenerative power is no longer in effect and she may die. Dr. Nemesis discovered that Magma is also able to recover from laceration wounds in her human form by changing to her energized form, the intense heat cauterizing and sealing any wounds. Since the late 2000s, Amara has also displayed the power of flight. However, this power has been inconsistently portrayed as in some of her recent appearances in X-Men: Gold show Magma flying but also being carried around by Rogue and Captain Britain.

Due to her Nova Roman heritage, Magma is well versed in Roman culture, including the Latin language, and is a skilled swordswoman.

Reception
 In 2014, Entertainment Weekly ranked Magma 79th in their "Let's rank every X-Man ever" list.

Other versions

Age of Apocalypse
In the Age of Apocalypse, Amara, like many other young mutants, is recruited by Apocalypse and became one of his assassins. Fanatical and in total control of her powers, Magma is sent to London to eliminate the leadership of the Human High Council. The attack is foiled by Weapon X (Logan), who kills Amara. The assassination attempt is actually a provocation on Apocalypse's behalf, who wants the Council to amass its fleets, making them more vulnerable to be destroyed.

Age of X-Man

Magma and the others were transported to another plane of existence by X-Man created in an attempt at a utopia where they and all other mutants would be at peace, altering their memories so they wouldn't resist. Magma became the main stunt coordinator of all the movies that are filmed at Studio X, which mainly featured actors Nightcrawler and Meggan Puceanu.

Amara flirted with Kurt and asked him about going to the fan dinner, which annoyed Meggan because she liked him as well. Later at the dinner, Amara defended the Stepford Cuckoos, saying that the Studio wouldn't be running as smoothly if the girls weren't around, after a group were disgusted by how the sisters flaunted their familial relationship.

While not observed, Magma was presumably returned to the real world when X-Man decided to release the mutants he forced to live in his plane of existence.

Days of Future Past
In an alternate version of the Days of Future Past future, a war between mutants and baseline humans, started by the latter, results in a mutant victory thanks to an alliance between Xavier's Institute and the Hellfire Club. Magma and Sunspot become the Chief Arbitrators of the Lords Cardinal, and create an idyllic state for mutants, while regular humans are left to fend for themselves. Mutants born to baseline humans are taken from their parents and those who oppose Magma and Sunspot are brainwashed by the Hellfire Club's agents.

X-Men: The End
Magma is seen fighting alongside the other X-Men against the Warskrulls who invade the mansion.

Ultimate Marvel
Ultimate Magma is featured as a former mutant prisoner of Camp: Angel and joined Kitty Pryde's resistance in the Ultimate Marvel title, Ultimate Comics: X-Men. She is later seen as part of a re-formed X-Men team, looking to leave Manhattan because Galactus is attacking. However, the entire X-Men team is recruited by S.H.I.E.L.D. who need mainly Kitty, Magma is seen later defending Utopia against militia members.

In other media

Television
 Amara Aquilla / Magma appears in X-Men: Evolution, voiced by Alexandra Carter. This version is a teenage Afro-Brazilian and member of the X-Men's junior team, the New Mutants, who lives at the Xavier Institute, displays no apparent connection to Nova Roma, a strong friendship with Tabitha Smith, and a budding relationship with Sam Guthrie.
 Amara appears in the Wolverine and the X-Men episode "Thieves' Gambit", voiced by Kari Wahlgren. This version is a teenage white Brazilian.

Video games
Alison Crestmere / Magma appears in X-Men Legends, voiced by Cree Summer. This version is American. Initially held prisoner by the Genetic Research and Security Organization (GRSO), the Brotherhood of Mutants attempt to kidnap her, but Wolverine and Cyclops rescue her and take her to the Xavier Institute, where she quickly becomes a student and is later recruited by Professor Xavier to join the X-Men.

References

External links
 
 UncannyXmen.net Spotlight on Magma

Characters created by Bob McLeod
Characters created by Chris Claremont
Characters created by John Buscema
Comics characters introduced in 1983
Fictional characters with earth or stone abilities
Fictional characters with fire or heat abilities
Fictional schoolteachers
Marvel Comics mutants
Marvel Comics female superheroes
New Mutants
X-Men supporting characters